The United States Pacific Fleet (USPACFLT) is a theater-level component command of the United States Navy, located in the Pacific Ocean. It provides naval forces to the Indo-Pacific Command. Fleet headquarters is at Joint Base Pearl Harbor–Hickam, Hawaii, with large secondary facilities at Naval Air Station North Island, California.

Origins
A Pacific Fleet was created in 1907 when the Asiatic Squadron and the Pacific Squadron were combined. In 1910, the ships of the First Squadron were organized back into a separate Asiatic Fleet. The General Order 94 of 6 December 1922 organized the United States Fleet, with the Battle Force as the Pacific presence. Until May 1940, the Battle Force was stationed on the West Coast of the United States. Headquarters, battleships, aircraft carriers and heavy cruisers were stationed at San Pedro close to the Long Beach Naval Shipyard. Light cruisers, destroyers and submarines were stationed at San Diego.

During the summer of 1940, as part of the U.S. response to Japanese expansionism, it was instructed to take an "advanced" position at Pearl Harbor, Hawaii. Long term basing at Pearl Harbor was so strongly opposed by the commander, Admiral James O. Richardson, that he personally protested in Washington. Political considerations were thought sufficiently important that he was relieved by Admiral Husband E. Kimmel, who was in command at the time of the attack on Pearl Harbor. The Pacific Fleet was formally recreated on 1 February 1941, when General Order 143 split the United States Fleet into separate Atlantic, Pacific, and Asiatic Fleets.

Composition of the Pacific Fleet in December 1941

On 7 December, the Fleet consisted of the Battle Force, Scouting Force, Base Force, Amphibious Force (ComPhibPac), Cruiser Force (COMCRUPAC), Destroyer Force (COMDESPAC), and the Submarine Force (COMSUBPAC). Also in Hawaii was the Fourteenth Naval District, commanded by Rear Admiral Claude C. Bloch.

United States Pacific Fleet – Commander: Admiral Husband E. Kimmel (Flagship: USS Pennsylvania)
Fourteenth Naval District – Commander: Rear Admiral Claude C. Bloch 
Battle Force, Pacific Fleet – Commander: Vice Admiral William S. Pye (Flagship: USS California)
Battleships, Battle Force (made up of three Battleship Divisions) – Commander: Rear Admiral Walter S. Anderson (Flagship: USS West Virginia)
Aircraft, Battle Force (made up of two Carrier Divisions) – Commander: Vice Admiral William F. Halsey Jr. (Flagship: USS Enterprise)
Cruisers, Battle Force (made up of two Cruiser Divisions) – Commander: Rear Admiral Herbert F. Leary (Flagship: USS Honolulu)
Destroyers, Battle Force (made up of two Destroyer Flotillas) – Commander: Rear Admiral Milo F. Draemel
Scouting Force, Pacific Fleet – Commander: Vice Admiral Wilson Brown (Flagship: USS Indianapolis)
Cruisers, Scouting Force (made up of three Cruiser Divisions) – Commander: Rear Admiral John H. Newton (Flagship: USS Chicago)
Aircraft, Scouting Force (made up of three Patrol Wings) – Commander: Rear Admiral John S. McCain Sr.
Submarines, Scouting Force (made up of five Submarine Squadrons) – Commander: Rear Admiral Thomas Withers (Flagship: N/A)

§ = Divisional flagship

Battle Force, Pacific Fleet

Battleships, Battle Force
 
Battleship Division 1 (Rear Admiral Isaac C. Kidd)

 §

Battleship Division 2 (Rear Admiral David W. Bagley)
 §

Battleship Division 4 (Rear Admiral Walter S. Anderson)

 §

These nine battleships were intended to counterbalance the ten battleships of the Imperial Japanese Navy.

Aircraft, Battle Force

Carrier Division 1 (Rear Admiral Aubrey W. Fitch)

 §
Carrier Division 2 (Vice Admiral William F. Halsey Jr.)
 §

When the attack took place, all three carriers were absent – Saratoga was in San Diego collecting her air group following a major refit, Enterprise was en route back to Hawaii following a mission to deliver aircraft to Wake Island, while Lexington had just departed on a similar mission to Midway.

Cruisers, Battle Force

Cruiser Division 3 (Rear Admiral Abel T. Bidwell)

 §
Cruiser Division 9 (Rear Admiral Herbert F. Leary)
 §

Destroyers, Battle Force

Scouting Force, Pacific Fleet

Cruisers, Scouting Force

Cruiser Division 4 (Rear Admiral John H. Newton)
 §

Cruiser Division 5 (Rear Admiral Raymond A. Spruance)

 §

Cruiser Division 6 (Rear Admiral Frank J. Fletcher)
 §

Submarines, Scouting Force

Submarine Squadron 2
Submarine Division 21
Submarine Division 22
Submarine Squadron 4
Submarine Division 41
Submarine Division 42
Submarine Division 43
Submarine Squadron 6
Submarine Division 61
Submarine Division 62
Submarine Squadron 8
Submarine Division 81
Submarine Division 82
Submarine Squadron 10
Submarine Division 101
Submarine Division 102

Aircraft, Scouting Force

Patrol Wing 1
VP-11
VP-12
VP-14
Patrol Wing 2
VP-21
VP-22
VP-23
VP-24
Patrol Wing 4
VP-41
VP-42

Other elements of the Pacific Fleet
The Amphibious Force was formally known as Commander, Amphibious Forces, Pacific Fleet (ComPhibPac). On 7 December 1941 the Amphibious Force comprised the Army's 3rd Infantry Division at Fort Lewis, under Army operational control, the 2nd Marine Division, the 2nd Marine Aircraft Wing, the 2nd Defense Battalion (see Marine defense battalions), and a depot. One of PhibPac's subordinate commands during World War II was Transports, Amphibious Force, Pacific Fleet, or TransPhibPac. The commander of TransPhibPac was known as ComTransPhibPac.

In December 1941, the fleet consisted of nine battleships, three aircraft carriers, 12 heavy cruisers, eight light cruisers, 50 destroyers, 33 submarines, and 100 patrol bombers. This was approximately the fleet's strength at the time of the Japanese attack on Pearl Harbor. That day, the Japanese Combined Fleet carried out the attack on Pearl Harbor, drawing the United States into World War II in the Pacific. The Pacific Fleet's Battle Line took the brunt of the attack, with two battleships destroyed, two salvageable but requiring lengthy reconstruction, and four more lightly to moderately damaged, forcing the U.S. Navy to rely primarily on aircraft carriers and submarines for many months afterward.

Subsequently, Pacific Fleet engagements during World War II included the Battle of Guam, the Marshalls-Gilberts raids, the Doolittle Raid, the Solomon Islands campaign, the Battle of the Coral Sea, the Battle of Midway, the Battle of the Eastern Solomons, the Battle of the Santa Cruz Islands, the Battle of the Philippine Sea, the Gilbert and Marshall Islands campaign, the Battle of Leyte Gulf, and the Battle of Okinawa. More minor battles included the Battle of Dutch Harbor. The Submarine Force began a sustained campaign of commerce raiding against Japan's merchant marine, beginning the first day of the war, which ultimately claimed 1,314 ships totalling about 5.3 million tons (by the imperfect postwar reckoning of the Joint Army-Navy Assessment Committee, JANAC). The West Loch disaster occurred at Pearl Harbor on 21 May 1944.

Post-1945
The Pacific Fleet took part in Operation Magic Carpet, the return of U.S. servicemen, after the end of the Second World War.
The organization of the Pacific Fleet in January 1947 is shown in Hal M. Friedman's Arguing over the American Lake: Bureaucracy and Rivalry in the U.S. Pacific, 1945–1947.

Since 1950 the Pacific Fleet has been involved in the Korean War, the Vietnam War, the two Taiwan Straits Crises, and a number of other operations including the Mayaguez Incident of 1975, as well as post-Vietnam related operations such as Operation New Arrivals. The RIMPAC exercise series began in 1971.

On 7 March 1984, the Secretaries of Transportation and Navy signed a Memorandum of Agreement which created the Maritime Defense Zones (MDZ). The Pacific MDZ is an echelon three Navy command under the Commander U.S. Pacific Fleet. The Pacific MDZ has responsibility for coastal defense up to  around the U.S. West Coast, Aleutian Islands, and Hawaii during times of hostility. On 1 October 1990, Commander U.S. Naval Forces Alaska (COMUSNAVAK) was established as the Naval Component Commander to Commander, Alaskan Command (COMALCOM). Since its inception, COMUSNAVAK has grown to become responsible for coordinating all Navy activity in the Alaska and Aleutian area, for detailed planning and coordination for the Naval portion of the Joint and Combined Exercise Northern Edge, and coordinates high-visibility U.S. Navy ship visits throughout Alaska in support of public relations and recruiting initiatives.

The very large PACEX 89 in the North Pacific involved the USN, Canadian Navy, Japanese Maritime Self-Defence Force, and ROK Navy. At the end of Exercise PACEX '89 a 54-ship formation was assembled for photos. Missouri and New Jersey performed a simultaneous gunfire demonstration for the aircraft carriers  and  during PACEX. The highlight of PacEx for Missouri was a port visit in Pusan, Republic of Korea.

Other operations undertaken since include participation in the Alaskan Oil Spill Joint Task Force, including participation of Commander, Amphibious Group Three, as deputy CJTF. This was the defence response to the Exxon Valdez oil spill of March 1989. Also, the Pacific Fleet was involved in Joint Task Force Philippines during the December 1989 coup attempt there, which involved two carrier battle groups, USS Midway and USS Enterprise-with their associated air wings operating in the Philippine Sea, chopped to JTF Philippines. During the operations, the carriers maintained deck alerts and 24-hour coverage of Manila with E-2C aircraft.

Around 10 September 1990,  and  visited Vladivostok. This marked the first United States Navy visit to the Soviet Union's Pacific port of Vladivostok since before World War II. Before the visit was completed, the crew received word that their Pacific cruise was canceled. They returned to Long Beach and joined the  Battle Group preparing to deploy to the Persian Gulf.

(CNA, 1994, 113) Further operations included JTF Marianas (August–September 1992) and JTF Hawaii (September–October 1992).

Other contingency operation after 1991 included Operation Sea Angel (Bangladesh relief) (led by Commander III Marine Expeditionary Force), Operation Eastern Exit, and involvement in the Somali Civil War – 'Restore Hope'. During 'Restore Hope,' Navy command arrangements underwent a number of changes during the operation. Other events led to the departure of the carriers and, as a result, Commander, Naval Forces responsibilities devolved first to Commander, Carrier Group Three, on Kitty Hawk, and thence to Commander, Amphibious Group Three. Finally Commander, Amphibious Squadron 3 became COMNAVFOR on 15 January with the departure of COMPHIGRU THREE after the completion of the MPF offload. (CNA, 1994, 168)

In 1995 Pacific Fleet surface ships were reshuffled. Effective 1 October 1995, the U.S. Pacific Fleet's surface ships were to be reorganized into six core battle groups and eight destroyer squadrons. Permanent core battle groups were to include a battle group commander, aircraft carrier, carrier air wing and at least two cruisers.
 Commander Cruiser-Destroyer Group 1/USS Constellation Battle Group:  and 
 ComCruDesGru 3/USS Carl Vinson Battle Group: ,  and 
 ComCruDesGru 5/USS Kitty Hawk Battle Group:  and 
 Commander Carrier Group 7 (ComCarGru 7)/USS Nimitz Battle Group:  and 
 ComCar Gru 3/USS Abraham Lincoln Battle Group:  and 
 Commander Carrier Group Five/USS Independence Battle Group:  and 

Commander, Naval Surface Forces Pacific:

In 1996 two carrier battle groups were sent to the Taiwan area during the Third Taiwan Straits Crisis.

Between 25 and 27 March 2006, Carrier Strike Group Nine participated in a series of anti-submarine warfare exercises (ASW) in Hawaiian waters while en route to the U.S. Seventh Fleet's area of responsibility.

As of 2011, the Pacific Fleet has authority over: 
numbered Third and Seventh Fleets
Naval Air Force, Pacific
Commander, Naval Surface Forces Pacific; 
Naval Submarine Force, Pacific

Naval shore commands over which USPACFLT has authority:
Commander Naval Forces Korea
Commander Naval Forces Japan
Commander Naval Forces Marianas

Commanders

See also
List of units of the United States Navy
History of the United States Navy
Military history of the United States
Pacific Partnership
United States Fleet Forces Command
United States Seventh Fleet

Notes

References

External links
 Official site
 Pacific Fleet Center-Long Beach  (Campaign to permanently berth the retired  in Long Beach, CA)
 Silent Service – Submarine Warfare in WWII (Rare Footage)

Pacific
Pacific
Military units and formations established in 1907
Military history of the Pacific Ocean
1907 establishments in the United States